This is a partial chronological list of cases decided by the United States Supreme Court during the White Court, the tenure of Chief Justice Edward Douglass White from December 19, 1910 through May 19, 1921.

References 

White
List